
Year 713 (DCCXIII) was a common year starting on Sunday (link will display the full calendar) of the Julian calendar. The denomination 713 for this year has been used since the early medieval period, when the Anno Domini calendar era became the prevalent method in Europe for naming years.

Events 
 By place 

 Byzantine Empire 
 June 3 – Emperor Philippicus is blinded, deposed, and sent into exile by conspirators of the Opsikion army in Thrace, after a reign of 1 year and 6 months. He is succeeded by Anastasios II, a bureaucrat and imperial secretary, who restores internal order and begins the reorganization of the Byzantine army. He executes the officers who have been directly involved in the conspiracy against Philippicus.
 Arab–Byzantine wars: The Umayyad Arabs under al-Abbas ibn al-Walid, son of caliph al-Walid I, sack Antioch in Pisidia (modern Turkey), which never recovers.

 Britain 
 King Ealdwulf of East Anglia dies, and is succeeded by his son Ælfwald. Queen Cuthburh of Northumbria travels south to found a monastery at Wimborne (Dorset). 

 Arabian Empire 
 Umayyad conquest of Hispania: The Visigothic Kingdom is finally defeated at the Battle of Segoyuela (Castile and León). Prince Theudimer signs the Treaty of Orihuela with Abd al-Aziz, governor of Al-Andalus, and is permitted to retain his authority in the area subsequently known as Tudmir. He keeps the citadel of Orihuela and several other settlements, including Alicante and Lorca on the Mediterranean Sea.
 Arab forces under Musa ibn Nusayr conquer the fortress city of Mérida, located on the borders of Andalusia. It becomes part of the Umayyad Emirate of Córdoba.

 China 
 Emperor Xuan Zong liquidates the highly lucrative "Inexhaustible Treasury", which is run by a prominent Buddhist monastery in Chang'an. This monastery collects vast amounts of money, silk, and treasures through multitudes of rich people's repentances, left on the premises anonymously. Although the monastery is generous in donations, Xuan Zong issues a decree abolishing their treasury, on the grounds that their banking practices were fraudulent, collects their riches, and distributes the wealth to various other Buddhist monasteries, Daoist abbeys, and to repair statues, halls, and bridges in the city.
 In Chang'an, for the annual Lantern Festival of this year, recently abdicated emperor Rui Zong erects an enormous lantern wheel at a city gate, with a recorded height of 200 ft. The frame is draped in brocades and silk gauze, adorned with gold and jade jewelry, and when its total of some 50,000 oil cups is lit, the radiance of it can be seen for miles.
 Xuan Zong allots the money of 20 million copper coins, and assigns about 1,000 craftsmen to construct a hall at a Buddhist monastery with tons of painted portraits of himself, and of deities, ghosts, etc.
 Xuan Zong wins a power struggle with his sister, Princess Taiping. He executes a large number of her allies and forces her to commit suicide.

 By topic 

 Literature 
 During the Tang Dynasty, publication of Kaiyuan Za Bao ("Bulletin of the Court"). First newspaper, hand printed on silk (approximate date).

 Religion 
 Construction begins on the Leshan Giant Buddha near Leshan, Sichuan Province (China). Upon its completion in 803, it will become the largest stone carved Buddha in the world.

Births 
 Carloman, mayor of the palace (approximate date)
 Stephen the Younger, Byzantine theologian (or 715)
 Zhang Xuan, Chinese painter (d. 755)

Deaths 
 Ali ibn Husayn, fourth Shia Imam and great-grandson of Prophet Muhammad
 Ealdwulf, king of East Anglia 
 Huineng, Chinese Zen Buddhist patriarch (b. 638)
 Li Jiao, chancellor of the Tang Dynasty (b. 644)
 Philippicus, Byzantine emperor
 Taiping, princess of the Tang Dynasty
 Suitbert, Anglo-Saxon missionary bishop
 Ursmar, Frankish abbot and missionary bishop
 Yijing, Chinese Buddhist monk and traveler (b. 635)

References